Farm to Market Roads in Texas are owned and maintained by the Texas Department of Transportation (TxDOT).

FM 1300

Farm to Market Road 1300 (FM 1300) is located in Wharton and Jackson counties.

FM 1300 begins at an intersection with FM 530 south of Speaks. The highway travels in a mostly eastern direction through rural farm areas. FM 1300 has a brief overlap with FM 1160, then continues to run east, ending at an intersection with SH 71 near El Campo.

On October 5, 1953, the highway was extended eastward to SH 71 over an old routing of FM 1160. FM 1300 was extended  westward to a county road on November 21, 1956. The highway was extended  westward to FM 530 on October 31, 1958.

Junction list

FM 1301

Farm to Market Road 1301 (FM 1301) is located in Wharton, Matagorda, and Brazoria counties.

Farm to Market Road 1301 begins as a four-lane highway (Boling Highway) in the heart of Wharton, passing Wharton County Junior College.  Leaving Wharton, FM 1301 gains a rural characteristic, travelling south-southeast towards Boling, with a four way stop at FM 442.  Continuing southwest, FM 1301 makes a brief turn to the south before entering Matagorda County and the unincorporated town of Pledger where the highway meets intersects FM 1728 as FM 1301 makes a hairpin V-shaped turn to the northeast, then curving back to the south and east into Brazoria County.  FM 1301 continues on a generally east-southeast route until it intersects SH 35 just shy of West Columbia.

FM 1301 was originally designated on July 14, 1949, from US 59 (later Loop 183, now Business US 59) north of Wharton southeast  to the Matagorda County Line. Two months later the road was extended to an intersection with SH 36 in West Columbia, replacing FM 1452. On June 15, 1955, the road was extended  to SH 35 in West Columbia, replacing Spur 59. On July 30, 1998, at district request, SH 35 was rerouted over a portion of FM 1301 from SH 36 to new SH 35.

Junction list

FM 1302

FM 1302 (1949)

The original FM 1302 was designated on July 21, 1949, from US 87 in Placedo northeast  to FM 404. On September 29, 1954, a  section from Placedo to Mitchell Siding was added. On October 31, 1957, the road was extended northeast  to the Jackson County line. FM 1302 was cancelled on November 25, 1958, and transferred to FM 616.

FM 1303

Farm to Market Road 1303 (FM 1303) is located in Wilson and Bexar counties.

FM 1303 begins at an intersection with FM 536 northwest of Floresville. The highway travels in a northwestern direction, ending at an intersection with Loop 1604 southwest of Elmendorf.

On September 27, 1960, the highway was extended  to Cano Verde. On June 1, 1965, FM 1303 was extended  northwestward to FM 1518 (now Loop 1604).

Junction list

FM 1303 (1949)

FM 1303 was cancelled on July 25, 1951, and transferred to FM 181.

FM 1304

FM 1304 (1949)

The original FM 1304 was designated on July 14, 1949, from SH 86, 4 miles west of Silverton, north and west  to Tule Creek Canyon. FM 1304 was cancelled on October 28, 1953, and transferred to FM 146 (later FM 284, now SH 207).

FM 1305

FM 1305 (1949)

The original FM 1305 was designated on July 14, 1949, from SH 86, 6 miles west of Dimmitt, south  to FM 1524. On January 21, 1956, the road was extended north  to FM 1057. On October 31, 1957, the road was extended south  to FM 145. On November 26, 1958, the road was extended north  to US 385 some 2 miles south of Hereford, replacing FM 2386 and creating a concurrency with FM 1057. This concurrency was removed on April 16, 1962. FM 1305 was cancelled on July 25, 1963, and transferred to FM 1055.

FM 1306

FM 1307

Farm to Market Road 1307 (FM 1307) is located in Cooke County in the city of Valley View.

FM 1307 begins at I-35 (US 77) in the southern part of the city. The highway travels in a northern direction along Lee Street, intersecting FM 922 near the city square. FM 1307 continues to run in a northern direction before ending at an intersection with the southbound frontage road of I-35.

The highway was extended on July 29, 1965, when US 77 was again rerouted with the construction of I-35.

Junction list

FM 1308

FM 1308 (1949)

The original FM 1308 was designated on July 14, 1949, from FM 122 (now SH 207), 8 miles south of Ralls, east  to Owens. FM 1308 was cancelled on March 24, 1958, and transferred to FM 40.

FM 1309

FM 1309 (1949)

The original FM 1309 was designated on July 14, 1949, from FM 122 (now SH 207), 5 miles south of Ralls, west  to a road intersection. On October 28, 1953, the road was extended west  to FM 378. FM 1309 was cancelled on March 24, 1958, and transferred to FM 40.

FM 1310

FM 1310 (1949)

The original FM 1310 was designated from Barwise east via FM 784 at Sandhill to Floydada, replacing a section of FM 784. The section from Sandhill to Floydada was returned to FM 784 on September 20, 1949, and FM 1310 was rerouted over a section of FM 784 from Sandhill north  and east  to a road intersection. On July 31, 1949, the road was extended east and north to US 70 at Lockney. The road was extended a final time on February 23, 1958, to FM 400 at Happy Union Gin, creating a concurrency with FM 789. FM 1310 was cancelled on December 21, 1959: the section from Lockney to FM 784 was transferred to FM 378 and the section from FM 784 to FM 400 (including the concurrency with FM 789) was transferred to FM 784.

FM 1311

Farm to Market Road 1311 (FM 1311) is located in McCulloch and Menard counties. It runs from US 190 southwest of Brady to SH 29 near Hext.

On January 30, 1951, the road was extended south  to the Menard County line. The same day the road was extended  miles south to SH 151 (now SH 29) near Hext. On June 19, 1957, the route was changed to RM 1311, but was changed back to FM 1311 on May 5, 1992.

RM 1312

Ranch to Market Road 1312 (RM 1312) is located in Crockett and Sutton counties. It runs from I-10 just west of the Sutton County line east to I-10 near RM 1989.

RM 1312 was designated on June 30, 1966, on the current route on a former section of US 290, which was rerouted onto I-10.

FM 1312 (1949)

FM 1312 was designated on July 14, 1949, from FM 1066 (now Gaines County Road 120), 4 miles south of Loop, to a point  miles south. On June 21, 1951, the road was extended south  miles to US 180. On December 14, 1956, the road was extended  miles north to US 62 at Wellman, replacing a section of FM 1066. FM 1312 was cancelled on February 10, 1966, and became a portion of FM 303.

FM 1313

FM 1314

Farm to Market Road 1314 (FM 1314) is located in Montgomery County. Its northern terminus is at an intersection with SH 105 in Conroe. It then travels southeast, ending at U.S. Route 59 (US 59), now cosigned as Interstate 69 (I-69), in Porter. The road extends southward approximately an additional  to its southern terminus, an intersection with Loop 494.

In 1970, the intersecting highway at its southern terminus was  re-designated Loop 494 when the new US 59, now co-signed as IH 69 was built.

Junction list

FM 1314 (1949)

FM 1314 was cancelled on December 2, 1953, and became a portion of FM 789.

FM 1315

Farm to Market Road 1315 (FM 1315) is located in Victoria County. It runs from US 77 Business to Loop 463.

On May 7, 1970, the road was extended northeast . On April 30, 1987, a  section from the end of FM 1315 northeast to then-proposed Loop 463 was added. On June 30, 1995, the entire route was transferred to UR 1315 and was one of a few FM routes to be signed as an urban road. On November 15, 2018, the route was changed back to FM 1315.

FM 1315 (1949)

The original FM 1315 was designated on July 14, 1949, from FM 304 (now FM 168) at Hart Camp, east  to the Hale County line. On October 31, 1958, the road was extended southeast  to FM 594 (now FM 179). On November 26, 1958, the road was extended to US 87, replacing FM 2063 and creating a concurrency with FM 594 at Cotton Center. On May 2, 1962, the road was extended east 9 miles to FM 400. On March 20, 1964, the concurrency with FM 594 was removed. FM 1315 was cancelled on September 19, 1968, and became a portion of FM 37.

FM 1316

FM 1316 (1949)

The first use of the FM 1316 designation was in Lubbock County, from US 62 at Wolfforth south  to the Lynn County line. FM 1316 was cancelled on October 14, 1954, and became a portion of FM 1073.

FM 1316 (1955)

The next use of the FM 1316 designation was in Bexar County, from FM 78 east of Randolph Air Force Base southeast  to US 90 (now I-10/US 90). FM 1316 was cancelled on August 8, 1958, and transferred to FM 1518.

FM 1317

FM 1318

RM 1319

 Originally FM 1319.

FM 1319

FM 1319 was designated on July 14, 1949, from FM 20 near US 290 toward String Prairie, although the northern terminus was moved to US 290 (now SH 21) a year later. On December 17, 1952, the road was extended south  to FM 535 west of Rosanky. FM 1319 was cancelled on March 29, 1957, and signed as SH 304 as it followed the same route as FM 1319.

RM 1320

 Originally FM 1320.

RM 1321

FM 1321

FM 1321 was designated on July 14, 1949, from US 83 at Watson's Store northeast  toward Oakalla. On March 31, 1955, the road was extended northeast  to Oakalla. FM 1321 was cancelled on April 12, 1955, and became a portion of FM 963 (now RM 963).

FM 1322

RM 1323

 Originally FM 1323.

FM 1324

FM 1324 (1949)

The original FM 1324 was designated on July 14, 1949, from SH 123 near San Marcos southeast  to the Guadalupe County line. FM 1324 was cancelled on June 27, 1951, and became a portion of FM 621.

FM 1325

Farm to Market Road 1325 (FM 1325) is located in Travis and Williamson counties.

FM 1326

Farm to Market Road 1326 (FM 1326) is located in Bowie County.

FM 1326 begins at an intersection with US 82 in Oak Grove. The highway travels in a mostly northern direction through rural farm land, ending at an intersection with FM 114 near Spring Hill.

The highway was extended  southward to US 82 at Oak Grove on October 13, 1954. Approximately  of FM 1326 was transferred to FM 2735 on October 9, 1961, when SH 26 was re-routed. The section of highway between FM 114 and US 259 was transferred to FM 114 in 1964 when the US 259 rerouting was completed.

FM 1326 (1949)

The original FM 1326 was designated on July 14, 1949, from SH 20 (now US 290) near Manor north  to New Sweden. On May 23, 151 FM 1326 was extended north to the Williamson county line. FM 1326 was cancelled on June 27, 1951, and became a portion of FM 973.

FM 1327

Farm to Market Road 1327 (FM 1327) is a  route in southern Travis County.

FM 1327 begins at Interstate 35 exit 223 between Onion Creek and Buda in southern Travis County, near the Hays County line. This location also serves as the current western terminus of the  SH 45 Toll Southeast toll road. The highway proceeds east, through the city of Creedmoor, where it crosses  FM 1625. Its eastern terminus is at  US 183 in Mustang Ridge. FM 1327 provides a free, at-grade alternative to the limited-access SH 45 toll road to its south, as this segment of the toll road lacks frontage roads.

FM 1327 was first designated on July 14, 1949. Its western terminus was near its current location, at the old alignment of  US 81 prior to the construction of the Interstate 35 freeway, and its eastern terminus was in Creedmoor. On December 10, 1951, the route was extended eastward over the original alignment of FM 1625 to its current terminus at US 183 (then  SH 29).  of the old route were transferred to a new alignment of FM 1625.

Junction list

FM 1328

FM 1328/RM 1328 (1949)

 The first use of the FM 1328 designation was in Williamson and Travis counties, from SH 29 at Whitestone School west  to the Travis County line. On May 23, 1951, the road was extended west  to Travis Peak Road. On October 1, 1956, the route was changed to RM 1328. RM 1328 was cancelled on November 26, 1958, and transferred to RM 1431.

RM 1328 (1959)

The second RM 1328 was designated on November 24, 1959, from RM 12 in Wimberley northeast  to RM 150 in Hays City. RM 1328 was cancelled on April 18, 1961, as TxDOT could not secure right of way. The route was later restored as RM 3237.

FM 1328 (1964)

The next use of the FM 1328 designation was in Milam County, from FM 437 at Davilla east  to a road intersection. FM 1328 was cancelled on May 30, 1978, and became a portion of FM 1915.

FM 1329

FM 1329 (1949)

The original FM 1329 was designated on July 14, 1949, from SH 95 at Bartlett west  to Schwertner. On November 20, 1951, the road was extended west  to US 81 at Jarrell. On December 17, 1952, the road was extended west  to SH 195 at Florence. FM 1329 was cancelled on July 10, 1953, and transferred to FM 1236 (now FM 487).

FM 1330

FM 1330 (1949)

The first use of the FM 1330 designation was in Williamson County, from SH 104 at Jonah south  to a road intersection. FM 1330 was cancelled on October 23, 1950, and removed from the highway system as the county was unable to obtain right-of-way for the route.

FM 1330 (1958)

The next use of the FM 1330 designation was in Lee County, from FM 141, some 12 miles northeast of Giddings, east  to Flag Pond Road (current FM 180). On November 24, 1959, FM 1330 was extended southeast  to the Washington County Line. FM 1330 was cancelled on December 8, 1959, and transferred to FM 1697.

FM 1331

FM 1332

FM 1333

FM 1334

FM 1335

FM 1335 (1949)

The original FM 1335 was designated on July 14, 1949, from US 281 southeast of Pleasanton northeast  to McCoy. On November 24, 1959, the road was extended northeast  from McCoy. FM 1335 was cancelled on October 17, 1960, and transferred to FM 541.

FM 1336

FM 1336 (1949)

The original FM 1336 was designated on July 14, 1949, from SH 16 at Medina west  to a county road. On July 31, 1972, it was extended west an additional . On November 25, 1975, the road was extended west  to RM 187. FM 1336 was cancelled on December 31, 1975, and became a portion of RM 337.

FM 1337

Farm to Market Road 1337 (FM 1337) is a  farm-to-market road in Cochran County.

The southern terminus of FM 1337 is at an intersection with SH 114, northwest of Whiteface. The northern terminus is at an intersection with FM 1780 east of Morton.

The current FM 1337 was designated on September 26, 1979, along the current route.

FM 1337 (1949)

The original FM 1337 was designated on July 14, 1949, from FM 482 north and southwest  to Bracken. FM 1337 was cancelled on September 5, 1973, and became a portion of FM 2252; the portion of FM 1337 in Bracken became a spur of FM 2252.

FM 1338

Farm to Market Road 1338 (FM 1338) is located in Kerr County.

FM 1338 begins at an intersection with SH 27 in western Kerrville. The highway travels in a northwestern direction through residential areas, leaving the Kerrville city limits near Doris Drive. After leaving Kerrville, FM 1338 travels through an area that features a mix of subdivisions and farm land, with the route becoming more rural near I-10. State maintenance for FM 1338 ends near the ranch Mustangs Forever, with the roadway continuing as Goat Creek Road. The section of highway in Kerrville is known locally as Goat Creek Road.

The current FM 1338 was designated on May 23, 1951, along the current route.

Junction list

FM 1338 (1949)

The original FM 1338 was designated on July 14, 1949, running from FM 1102 in Hunter south  to a road intersection. Two months later FM 1338 was cancelled and became a portion of FM 1102.

FM 1339

FM 1340

Farm to Market Road 1340 (FM 1340) is located in Kerr County.

FM 1340 begins at an intersection with SH 39 at Hunt. The highway travels in a northwestern direction through largely rural farming and ranching areas, ending at an intersection with SH 41. FM 1340 runs parallel to the North Fork Guadalupe River for most of its length, crossing the river several times.

The highway was extended  westward on June 1, 1965. FM 1340 was extended  westward on May 5, 1966. The route was extended  westward on June 7, 1967. FM 1340 was extended  northward to its current terminus at SH 41 on July 11, 1968.

FM 1341

Farm to Market Road 1341 (FM 1341) is located in Kerr County.

FM 1341 begins at an intersection with SH 16 in Kerrville near Hill Country High School. The highway travels in a southeast direction along Golf Avenue, turning northeast onto Cypress Creek Road at a traffic circle intersection with Tivy Street. FM 1341 travels through a residential area, leaving the Kerrville city limits just east of Loop 534. East of Kerrville, the highway travels through hilly terrain of the Texas Hill Country, running in close proximity to I-10. FM 1341 crosses under I-10 with no direct connection east of the Cypress Creek Community Center. The highway makes a nearly 90-degree turn at Board Mountain Road and runs in a southern direction before ending at I-10 in the Bear Creek area; the roadway continues past I-10 as Cypress Creek Road, which travels to Comfort.

The highway was relocated on July 17, 1951, with the western terminus changing from SH 27 to SH 16. FM 1341 was extended  southeastward to I-10 on November 25, 1975. On August 29, 1989, FM 1341 was rerouted from Wheless Avenue to Golf Avenue & Turner Street from SH 16 to Tivy Street.

Junction list

FM 1342

FM 1342 (1949)

The original FM 1342 was designated on July 14, 1949, from SH 97 in Los Angeles south and west  to a road intersection. FM 1342 was cancelled on December 17, 1952, and transferred to FM 468.

FM 1343

FM 1344

FM 1345
Farm to Market Road 1345 (FM 1345) is a designation that has been used twice. No highway currently uses the FM 1345 designation.

FM 1345 (1949)

The first use of the FM 1345 designation was in Wilson County, from SH 97 southwest of Floresville south  to a road intersection. On May 23, 1951, the road was extended southeast  to FM 541. FM 1345 was cancelled on May 25, 1953, and transferred to FM 1344.

FM 1345 (1953)

The second use of the FM 1345 designation was in Duval County, from SH 339, 10 miles south of Benavides, south  to SH 285. On December 1, 1953, the route was signed, but not designated, as SH 339. FM 1345 was cancelled on August 29, 1990, as the SH 339 designation became official.

FM 1346

Farm to Market Road 1346 (FM 1346) is located in Bexar and Wilson counties.

FM 1346 begins at an intersection with Loop 13 (W.W. White Road) in eastern San Antonio. The highway travels in an eastern direction along Houston Street and has a junction with I-410 / SH 130 before running through a less developed area of the city and leaves the city at an intersection with Foster Road. FM 1346 intersects FM 1516 at Martinez then enters St. Hedwig at Loop 1604 then turns south at St. Hedwig Road before turning east at La Vernia Road in Carpenter. The highway turns southeast at Wilson County Road 347 and enters La Vernia, where FM 1346 ends at an intersection with FM 775.

The highway was extended  to the end of FM 1980 on October 13, 1954, and on to Loop 13 on October 27, 1954, absorbing FM 1980 in the process. The section of FM 1346 between Loop 13 and I-410 was removed from the highway system on November 24, 1969, but was later restored on October 24, 1978. The section of highway between Loop 13 and FM 1516 was internally re-designated as Urban Road 1346 by TxDOT on June 27, 1995. FM 1346 was extended  southeastward to FM 775 on July 31, 2008. On November 15, 2018, UR 1346 was changed back to FM 1346. The section of FM 1346 west of I-410 was proposed for decommissioning in 2014 as part of TxDOT's San Antonio turnback proposal, which would have turned back over 129 miles of roads to the city of San Antonio, but the city of San Antonio rejected that proposal.

Junction list

FM 1347

FM 1348

FM 1349

FM 1350

FM 1350 begins at an intersection with RM 480 in Center Point. FM 1350 continues east, ending at SH 27.

FM 1350 was designated on May 23, 1951, on its current route.

FM 1350 (1949)

FM 1350 was designated on July 14, 1949, from US 59 south of Beeville to the Bee-Live Oak County Line near Argenta. Four months later FM 1350 was cancelled and transferred to FM 888.

FM 1351

FM 1352

FM 1353

FM 1354

FM 1355

FM 1356

RM 1357

FM 1357 (1949)

The first use of the FM 1357 designation was in Live Oak County, from SH 9 (now I-37), 2.4 miles north of SH 202 (now US 59), northeast  to a road intersection with a  spur connection. This spur was cancelled and renumbered as FM 1596 eight months later. On December 17, 1952, the road was extended southwest  to SH 202. FM 1357 was cancelled on October 14, 1954, and became a portion of FM 799.

FM 1357 (1955)

On June 30, 1961, a  section north of US 80 was transferred to Loop 338. The remainder of FM 1357 (formerly a portion of Loop 338) was cancelled and transferred to Loop 338 on April 3, 1964.

FM 1358

FM 1359

FM 1360

FM 1361

FM 1362

FM 1363

FM 1364

FM 1365

FM 1366

FM 1367

FM 1368

FM 1368 (1949)

The original FM 1368 was designated on July 14, 1949, from FM 80 at Freestone west  to the Limestone County line. On January 23, 1953, the road was extended southwest  to SH 164. FM 1368 was cancelled on May 31, 1955, and became a portion of FM 489.

FM 1369
Farm to Market Road 1369 (FM 1369) is a designation that has been used twice. No highway currently uses the FM 1369 designation.

FM 1369 (1949)

The first use of the FM 1369 designation was in Grimes County, from SH 90 at Anderson, southeast  to Plantersville. FM 1369 was cancelled on October 27, 1954, and became a portion of FM 1774.

FM 1369 (1955)

The second use of the FM 1369 designation was in Midland County, from US 80 (now I-20 Business) some 2 miles west of Midland, northwest  to SH 158. On September 20, 1961, the road was extended south  to I-20. In 1978, the route was co-located with Loop 250 and this co-location was removed on July 24, 1984, cancelling FM 1369.

FM 1370

FM 1371

Farm to Market Road 1371 (FM 1371) is located in Washington and Austin counties. It runs from US 290 west of Chappell Hill south to FM 1456.

FM 1371 was designated on July 14, 1949, from US 290, 1 mile east of Chappell Hill, south  to the north end of the Caney Creek Bridge at the Austin County line. On April 24, 1953, the road was extended  miles south to FM 1456. On July 31, 1964, the road was extended 1.53 miles west along former US 290 to new US 290.

FM 1372

FM 1373

FM 1374

FM 1375

RM 1376

Ranch to Market Road 1376 (RM 1376) is located in Kendall and Gillespie counties in the Hill Country.

RM 1376 begins at an intersection with Bus. US 87 in Boerne. The highway travels in a mostly northern direction through semi-rural areas with some subdivisions and guest ranches, with the route becoming more rural north of Nollkamper Road. RM 1376 crosses the Guadalupe River, then has an overlap with RM 473 near Sisterdale. North of Sisterdale, the highway starts to travel through hilly areas, intersects RM 1888, and travels through Luckenbach. RM 1376 travels west of Cain City then ends at an intersection with US 290 southeast of Fredericksburg.

On October 18, 1960, the highway was extended to US 87 (now Bus. US 87), absorbing FM 1892.

Junction list

FM 1376 (1949)

FM 1376 was cancelled on January 29, 1953, and transferred to FM 455 .

FM 1377

FM 1378

Farm to Market Road 1378 (FM 1378) is a  roadway located in southern Collin County. The route connects SH 5 to FM 2514. FM 1378 begins at an intersection with SH 5 south of McKinney, southeastward approximately 14.0 miles via Forest Grove and Lucas to FM 544 west of Wylie.

FM 1378 was designated on July 14, 1949, from US 75 (now SH 5) to Forest Grove. On May 23, 1951, FM 1378 was extended south to FM 1379 at Lucas. On September 14, 1951, FM 1378 was extended south to FM 544 (later FM 3412, now Brown Street), replacing FM 1379. On January 6, 1978, FM 1378 was extended south to current FM 544. This extension was transferred from FM 544. It was changed to Urban Road 1378 in 1995 by Texas Department of Transportation. On October 30, 2008, the section of FM 1378 between FM 2514 and FM 544 was removed from the state highway system and given to the City of Wylie. The removed segment has been widened to an urban multilane highway. However, a couple signs remain at the intersection with FM 3412 (which also has signage remaining).

Junction list

FM 1379

Farm to Market Road 1379 (FM 1379) is located in Midland County.

FM 1379 begins at an intersection with SH 349 south of Midland. The highway travels in a northeast direction, turning in a more northern direction at RM 1357. FM 1379 has an overlap with SH 158 before running through Greenwood, where the route ends at an intersection with FM 307.

FM 1379 was extended  southward and westward to a county road on May 2, 1962. The highway was extended  along County Road 300 to SH 349 on October 28, 1999.

Junction list

FM 1379 (1949)

The original FM 1379 was designated on July 15, 1949, from FM 544 west of Wylie north  to Lucas. FM 1379 was cancelled on September 14, 1951, and became a portion of FM 1378.

FM 1380

Farm to Market Road 1380 (FM 1380) is located in Motley County. It runs from US 62/US 70 to FM 94.

FM 1380 begins at an intersection with US 62 / US 70 east of Matador. The highway travels in a northern direction through rural areas before ending at an intersection with FM 94.

The current FM 1380 was designated on September 26, 1979, on the current route.

FM 1380 (1949)

FM 1380 was first designated on July 25, 1949, running from US 77 in Carrollton to a road intersection west of the Trinity River. The highway was removed from the state highway system and was given to the city of Carrollton on August 21, 1978. The road is now known as Belt Line Road.

FM 1381

Farm to Market Road 1381 (FM 1381) is located in Parmer County.

FM 1381 begins at an intersection with US 60/SH 86 southwest of Bovina. The highway runs in a northern direction just west of the Bovina city limits for its entire length before ending at an intersection with FM 2290.

The current FM 1381 was designated on May 7, 1974, along the current route.

FM 1381 (1949)

The original FM 1381 was designated on July 15, 1949, from US 77 south of Dallas west  to DeSoto. FM 1381 was cancelled on November 16, 1972, and became a portion of FM 1382.

FM 1382

Farm to Market Road 1382 (FM 1382) runs from I-35E in DeSoto to SH 180 in Grand Prairie. Most of the highway is part of Belt Line Road, becoming its own route through Cedar Hill around Joe Pool Lake. FM 1382 is one of only two farm to market roads remaining in Dallas County, the other being FM 1389.

FM 1382 begins at I-35E in DeSoto. The highway travels in a western direction through the town and enters Cedar Hill at an intersection with Duncanville Road. FM 1382 travels through a suburban area of the city and turns northwest at Belt Line Road, before running near a major retail center near US 67. Northwest of Pleasant Run Road, the highway travels near several subdivisions before taking a semi-rural route after an intersection with New Clark Road. FM 1382 then travels near the Cedar Hill campus of Northwood University and Cedar Hill State Park near the eastern shore of Joe Pool Lake. The highway travels through a mountain ridge near the state park before entering the city limits of Dallas. FM 1382 briefly travels through city, passes a few subdivisions and has an intersection with Camp Wisdom Road before entering Grand Prairie near I-20. The highway parallels Mountain Creek from I-20 and SE 14th Street then travels near a suburban area of the city. FM 1382 ends at SH 180 near the Grand Prairie town square.

The highway was extended  southeastward to a county road near Cedar Hill on October 26, 1954. FM 1382 was extended  southeastward to Belt Line Road in Cedar Hill on October 31, 1958. The highway was extended to Desoto on November 3, 1972, and to I-35E 13 days later, replacing FM 1381. All of FM 1382 was internally re-designated as Urban Road 1382 by TxDOT on June 27, 1995. On November 15, 2018, the route was changed back to FM 1382.

Junction list

FM 1383

Farm to Market Road 1383 (FM 1383) is located in Fayette County.

FM 1383 begins at an intersection with US 90 west of Weimar. The highway travels in a northern direction through rural farming areas, running through Dubina at Piano Bridge Road. FM 1383 turns west near an intersection with FM 1965. The highway runs through Ammannsville before ending at an intersection with US 77 near the town of Swiss Alp.

The highway was extended eastward and southward to US 90 on November 21, 1956. On June 2, 1967, FM 1383 was extended along and west of US 77 to a county road. The 1967 extension was renumbered FM 3171 on August 5, 1968.

Junction list

FM 1383 (1949)

The original FM 1383 was designated on July 15, 1949, from SH 121 east of Lewisville south and east  to the Collin County line. FM 1383 was cancelled on November 20, 1951, and transferred to FM 544.

FM 1384

Farm to Market Road 1384 (FM 1384) is located in Denton County.

State maintenance for FM 1384 begins at the intersection of Oliver Creek Road and A.A. Bumgarner Road near the community of Drop. The highway travels in an eastern direction then turns south at Sherman Road before turning back east. FM 1384 turns back south at Jim Baker Road before turning east near Oliver Creek. The highway continues to run in an eastward direction, ending at an intersection with FM 156 near the towns of Dish, Northlake and Justin.

FM 1384 was designated on July 15, 1949, running from FM 156 westward to Drop.

FM 1385

Farm to Market Road 1385 (FM 1385) is located in Denton County.

FM 1385 begins at an intersection with US 380 in Little Elm near the Savannah subdivision. The highway travels in a northern direction near several subdivisions before beginning a more rural route near FM 428. FM 1385 has an overlap with FM 428 between Aubrey and Celina. The highway turns west at Mobberly Road, turning back to the north at Mustang Road. The highway continues running in a northern direction through rural farming areas before ending at an intersection with FM 455 near Pilot Point.

The highway was extended  eastward and southward to FM 428 on May 23, 1951. On October 28, 1953, FM 1385 was extended  to SH 24 (now US 380), absorbing FM 1170 in the process.

Junction list

FM 1386

Farm to Market Road 1386 (FM 1386) is located in Caldwell County.

FM 1386 begins at an intersection with FM 1322 northeast of Luling. The highway travels in an eastern direction, turning north at County Road 149. FM 1386 continues to run in a northern direction before ending at County Road 150.

The current FM 1386 was designated on October 31, 1958, from FM 1322 to County Road 150. FM 1386 was cancelled on March 31, 2005, and returned to Caldwell County, but this was repealed on March 26, 2009, restoring FM 1386.

FM 1386 (1949)

The original FM 1386 was designated on July 15, 1949, from US 77 near Milford northwest  to a county road. FM 1386 was cancelled on March 24, 1958, and transferred to FM 308.

FM 1387

Farm to Market Road 1387 (FM 1387) is located in Ellis County.

FM 1387 begins at an intersection with Bus. US 287 in Midlothian near the town square. The highway runs in a northern direction along 10th Street before turning east onto Avenue E. FM 1387 zigzags around Hawkins Spring Park near Midlothian Parkway. The highway travels near several subdivisions before ending at an intersection with FM 664.

FM 1387 was designated on July 15, 1949, running from US 67 (which became Loop 489 in 1970, but Bus. The highway was extended  eastward to FM 664 on November 20, 1951. On June 30, 2006, FM 1387 was re-routed onto 10th Street in Midlothian to Bus. US 287, with the former highway being turned over to the city for maintenance. Part of Bus. US 67 was also turned over to the city for maintenance.

FM 1388

Farm to Market 1388 (FM 1388) is located in Kaufman County.

FM 1388 begins at an intersection with FM 148 in Grays Prairie. The highway travels in a northeast direction and enters Oak Grove after crossing Kings Creek. FM 1388 runs in a more northward direction near an intersection with FM 2860 then ends at SH 34 in Kaufman.

The highway was extended  northward to US 175 on November 21, 1956. FM 1388 was extended  southward to FM 148 on October 31, 1958. On September 24, 2020, the section from US 175 to SH 34 was given to the city of Kaufman.

Junction list

FM 1389

Farm to Market Road 1389 (FM 1389) is located mostly in Kaufman County, with a small section in Dallas County. The highway is one of only two farm to market roads remaining in Dallas County, with FM 1382 being the other one. The curve at Combine Road is the only portion of the road within Dallas County.

FM 1389 begins at Farr Altom Road. The highway travels in a northwestern direction, intersecting FM 3039 in Combine. FM 1389 turns to the northeast at Combine Road, then turns in a more northward direction at Martin Lane. The highway ends at a junction with US 175 in Seagoville. FM 1389 travels near the massive flood plain for the East Fork Trinity River for most of its route, most of which is owned by the John Bunker Sands Wetland Center.

The highway was extended  southeastward to a road intersection on November 21, 1956.

Junction list

FM 1390

Farm to Market Road 1390 (FM 1390) is located in Kaufman County.

FM 1390 begins at an intersection with SH 34 between Rosser and Scurry. The highway travels in a northwest direction then curves to the northeast near Warsaw Creek. FM 1390 has an overlap with FM 148 northwest of Scurry near Warsaw around a soil conservation lake. The highway continues to zigzag around property lines and small lakes and ponds, ending at a junction with US 175.

The highway was extended  northward on July 1, 1954, when US 175 was re-routed. FM 1390 was extended southward to SH 34 on May 6, 1964.

Junction list

FM 1391

Farm to Market Road 1391 (FM 1391) is located in Kaufman County.

The designation file shown is actually that of FM 2711.

FM 1391 was designated on July 15, 1949, from FM 85 north of Mabank west  to a road intersection. On September 21, 1955, the road was extended west to US 175 (later Loop 346, now Business US 175-D).

FM 1392

Farm to Market Road 1392 (FM 1392) is located in Kaufman County.

FM 1392 begins at an intersection with US 80 in Lawrence. The highway travels in a northern direction, turning northwest at County Road 237, then turns northeast at County Road 239. FM 1392 continues to run in a northeast direction, ending at an intersection with SH 205.

The highway was extended  to SH 205 on October 26, 1954.

FM 1393

FM 1394

FM 1395

Farm to Market Road 1395 (FM 1395) is located in Van Zandt County.

FM 1395 begins at an intersection with FM 859 north of Edgewood. The highway travels in a northwestern direction, ending at an intersection with FM 47 near Lake Tawakoni.

The current FM 1395 was designated on October 31, 1958, on the current route.

FM 1395 (1949)

The original FM 1395 was designated on July 15, 1949, from FM 549 west  to a county road. FM 1395 was cancelled on November 4, 1955, and transferred to FM 1143 (now SH 276).

FM 1396

Farm to Market Road 1396 (FM 1396) is located in Fannin County.

FM 1396 begins at an intersection with SH 78 north of Bonham. The highway travels in an eastern direction and intersects FM 273 north of Lake Bonham. FM 1396 turns south near County Road 2700, runs through Allens Chapel, then intersects US 82 in western Honey Grove. The highway runs through rural, undeveloped areas of the town before ending at an intersection with SH 56.

The highway was extended  westward to FM 273 in 1955. In 2004, FM 1396 was extended to SH 78 over an old alignment of FM 273 when that highway was re-routed.

Junction list

FM 1396 (1949)

The original FM 1396 was designated on July 15, 1949, from US 67 (now concurrent with I-30) in Royse City east  to the Hunt County line. FM 1396 was cancelled on February 26, 1953, and transferred to FM 35.

FM 1397

Farm to Market Road 1397 (FM 1397) is located in Bowie County.

FM 1397 begins at a junction with I-30/US 59/SH 93 in Texarkana. The highway travels in a northern direction along Summerhill Road through a commercial and residential area of the city, leaving Texarkana near Shiling Road. After leaving Texarkana, FM 1397 travels through rural farming areas then turns to the west at an intersection with County Road 2320. The highway starts to run in a more southward direction near Diversion Canal then ends at an intersection with FM 559 in Wamba.

The highway's southern terminus was relocated to I-30 on August 31, 1967, with the old section of FM 1397 south of the interstate being transferred to SH 93.

Junction list

FM 1398

Farm to Market Road 1398 (FM 1398) is located in Bowie County.

FM 1398 begins at an intersection with US 82 in Hooks. The highway travels in a northern direction through a residential area, leaving the town after crossing under I-30 without any direct connection. North of Hooks, FM 1398 runs through more rural areas, then turns east at an intersection with County Roads 2109 / 2212 in Red Bank. The highway turns south east of Barkman, continuing to run south towards the town of Leary. FM 1398 crosses I-30 for a second time before ending at an intersection with US 82.

On May 23, 1951, the highway was extended  eastward and southward of Red Bank to US 82 west of Leary.

FM 1399

Notes

References

+13
Farm to market roads 1300
Farm to Market Roads 1300